Johan Marcus Gunnar Franzén (born 23 December 1979) is a Swedish former professional ice hockey winger who played 11 seasons for the Detroit Red Wings of the National Hockey League (NHL). His career ended early in the 2015-16 season due to post-concussion syndrome. He also played for Linköpings HC in the Elitserien (later Swedish Hockey League).

Franzén was drafted by the Red Wings in the third round, 97th overall, of the 2004 NHL Entry Draft and won the Stanley Cup with the team in 2008.

Playing career

Linköpings HC
Franzén began playing ice hockey in Boro/Vetlanda HC, Landsbro near Vetlanda in Sweden. He was suspended for a full year after knocking down a referee, but was then moved to play with the Tranås AIF in the Swedish Allsvenskan in 1999. After one season with the club, he moved to Linköpings HC, where he stayed for five seasons, helping the club win the promotion for play in the Swedish top-level Elitserien in 2001. Recommended by European scout Håkan Andersson, Franzén was drafted by the Red Wings in 2004 in the third round, 97th overall.

Detroit Red Wings
For the 2005–06 season, Franzén played in the NHL with Detroit, totaling 80 games for 16 points (12 goals and four assists) in his rookie season. His workmanlike service was lauded by former teammate and captain Steve Yzerman, who gave him the nickname "The Mule" because "he carries the load." Franzén was named "Detroit Red Wings Rookie of the Year" by the Detroit Sports Broadcasters' Association for his play during the season. Franzen’s rookie season was also Yzerman’s final NHL season.

In August 2006, Franzén re-signed with Detroit on a three-year, $2.825 million contract. On 21 April 2007, during a Stanley Cup playoff game against the Calgary Flames, Flames goaltender Jamie McLennan slashed Franzén twice in the leg. McLennan was due to be assessed a minor penalty. However, after play was stopped, McLennan again violently slashed Franzén in the stomach, resulting in a game misconduct for McLennan. In the following game, Game 6, Franzén scored the winning goal in double-overtime to advance the Red Wings past the Flames.

On 30 March 2008, Franzén scored his sixth game-winning goal for the month of March, against the Nashville Predators. This goal broke the Red Wings team record for most game-winning goals in one month (5) set by Gordie Howe in February 1952, and duplicated in January 1956. (Howe's feat was matched by Franzén's teammate Henrik Zetterberg in January 2007.) Coincidentally, Franzén broke Howe's record while Howe was attending the game and celebrating his 80th birthday.

Franzén scored his first career NHL hat-trick against the Colorado Avalanche in Game 2 of the Western Conference Semifinals of the 2008 playoffs. It was the Red Wings' first playoff hat-trick since Darren McCarty scored three goals on 18 May 2002, also against the Avalanche. During Game 4, on 1 May 2008, Franzén had another hat-trick, scoring his ninth goal of the series, breaking the Detroit Red Wings franchise record for most goals in a playoff series: Gordie Howe had scored eight goals in a seven-game series in 1949.

Franzén currently holds the franchise record (tied with Henrik Zetterberg) for most goals in a playoff year with 13, a record previously held at ten by Petr Klíma, Sergei Fedorov and Brett Hull. Zetterberg tied his mark of 13 goals after scoring the Cup winning goal in Game 6 of the 2008 Stanley Cup Finals.

On 24 May 2009, in a Game 4 of the Western Conference Finals against the Chicago Blackhawks, Franzén was involved in a minor scrum behind the net after the whistle. Franzén was exchanging words with Patrick Kane when Kane began chewing on his mouth guard. Franzén reached down and ripped the mouth guard out of Kane's mouth and threw it down to the ice.

On 11 April 2009, Franzén signed a contract extension with the Red Wings for 11 years. The contract runs through the 2019–20 season, worth a total of $43.5 million. The contract has an annual cap hit of $3,954,545, although it is front loaded. The contract by year pays as follows: 2009–10, $5.5 million; 2010–11, $5 million; 2011–13, $5.25 million; 2013–16, $5 million; 2016–17, $3.5 million; 2017–18, $2 million; and finally from 2018–20, $1 million.

On 8 October 2009, Franzén suffered a torn anterior cruciate ligament (ACL), forcing him to miss 55 games before he was able to return to Detroit's lineup in a game against the St. Louis Blues, where he recorded an assist. Following Detroit's next game, he recorded his first goal since returning from injury.

On 6 May 2010, Franzén scored three goals in a span of 3:26 (two seconds shy of the NHL record for fastest playoff hat-trick) in the first period of Detroit's Western Conference Semifinal game against the San Jose Sharks. He had been initially credited with another goal, scored two minutes before his first credited goal of the night, but this was later corrected to an assist on a Todd Bertuzzi redirect. While this goal would not have grabbed him the NHL record fastest hat-trick, he did eventually reclaim his tally by scoring a fourth goal later on in the game.

On 2 February 2011, Franzén became only the second player in 14 years, joining Marián Gáborík, to score five goals in one game. He tallied two even strength goals, two power play goals and added an empty net goal in a 7–5 victory over the Ottawa Senators. He joins Sergei Fedorov and Syd Howe as the only Red Wings to do so.

On 3 March 2014, Franzén was named NHL's First Star of the Week. He recorded three goals and two assists in two games to help lead the Red Wings to consecutive road victories.

In 2015, Franzén missed the remainder of the season due to concussion symptoms after he was blindsided by a check late in a game at Edmonton by the Oilers' Rob Klinkhammer on 6 January 2015. After being deemed medically fit to return in the 2015–2016 season, Franzén would play only two games before the return of concussion symptoms and was put on the team's long term injury reserve list. Franzén's contract expired in 2020, when the NHL season was cut short by the COVID-19 pandemic.

International play

   
   
   
 
Franzén replaced Tomas Holmström at the 2010 Winter Olympics in Vancouver.

Franzén was replaced by teammate Gustav Nyquist at the 2014 Winter Olympics in Sochi due to a concussion.

Personal life
Franzén and his girlfriend Cecilia married in 2009. The couple had their first child, Eddie Bo Johan Franzén, in 2011  On 13 May 2013, Cecilia gave birth to their second son, Oliver Gunnar Franzén, the day after the Red Wings won Game 7 of the Stanley Cup Quarterfinals against the Anaheim Ducks.
The couple quietly divorced in 2020 after their move back to Sweden.
Fans and the teammates alike often refer to Franzén as "The Mule," a nickname given to him by Steve Yzerman. "He's big and strong and he reminded me of a mule that day," Yzerman stated.

Records
 NHL record for most goals in a 4-game playoff series (9).
 Detroit Red Wings record for most game-winning goals in one month, March 2008 (6).
 Detroit Red Wings record for most goals in a single playoff series (9).
 Detroit Red Wings record for consecutive playoff games with a point (12, tied with Gordie Howe)
 Detroit Red Wings record for consecutive playoff games with a goal (5, tied with Gordie Howe and Ted Lindsay).
 Detroit Red Wings record for most goals in a single playoff year (13, tied with Henrik Zetterberg).
 Detroit Red Wings record for most game-winning goals in one playoff year (5, 2008)
 Detroit Red Wings record for most points in a playoff game (6), 6 May 2010, vs. San Jose Sharks
 Detroit Red Wings record for most consecutive occasions where a Red Wings player scored 4 goals in a game (final game on that 5-game streak: 2 February 2011 at Ottawa Senators), the next one was by Anthony Mantha vs. Dallas Stars on 6 October 2019.

Career statistics

Regular season and playoffs
Bold indicates led league

International

Awards and honours

References

External links
 

1979 births
Living people
Detroit Red Wings draft picks
Detroit Red Wings players
Ice hockey players at the 2010 Winter Olympics
Linköping HC players
Olympic ice hockey players of Sweden
People from Vetlanda Municipality
Stanley Cup champions
Swedish expatriate ice hockey players in the United States
Swedish ice hockey left wingers
Sportspeople from Jönköping County